Clio pyramidata is a species of sea butterfly, a floating and swimming sea snail, a pelagic marine gastropod mollusk in the family Cliidae.

Formae
 Forma Clio pyramidata f. lanceolata Lesueur, 1813
 Forma Clio pyramidata f. pyramidata Linnaeus, 1767
 Forma Clio pyramidata f. tyrrhenica A.W. Janssen, 2012

Distribution 
This species has a wide distribution:  subtropical., European waters, the Mediterranean Sea, the Atlantic Ocean (Azores, Cape Verde), the Northwest Atlantic (Gulf of Maine), the Caribbean Sea, the Gulf of Mexico, and off New Zealand.

Description 
The maximum recorded shell length is 21 mm.

Habitat 
Minimum recorded depth is 0 m. Maximum recorded depth is 3718 m.

References

 Gofas, S.; Le Renard, J.; Bouchet, P. (2001). Mollusca, in: Costello, M.J. et al. (Ed.) (2001). European register of marine species: a check-list of the marine species in Europe and a bibliography of guides to their identification. Collection Patrimoines Naturels, 50: pp. 180–213 
  Pollock, L.W. (1998). A practical guide to the marine animals of northeastern North America. Rutgers University Press. New Brunswick, New Jersey & London. 367 pp
 Rolán E., 2005. Malacological Fauna From The Cape Verde Archipelago. Part 1, Polyplacophora and Gastropoda.
 Willan, R. (2009). Opisthobranchia (Mollusca). In: Gordon, D. (Ed.) (2009). New Zealand Inventory of Biodiversity. Volume One: Kingdom Animalia. 584 pp 
 Rosenberg, G., F. Moretzsohn, and E. F. García. 2009. Gastropoda (Mollusca) of the Gulf of Mexico, Pp. 579–699 in Felder, D.L. and D.K. Camp (eds.), Gulf of Mexico–Origins, Waters, and Biota. Biodiversity. Texas A&M Press, College Station, Texas. 
 Janssen A.W. (2012) Late Quaternary to Recent holoplanktonic Mollusca (Gastropoda) from bottom samples of the eastern Mediterranean Sea: systematics, morphology. Bollettino Malacologico 48 (suppl. 9): 1-105

External links 
 Clio pyramidata at Marine Species Identification Portal

Cavoliniidae
Molluscs of the Atlantic Ocean
Molluscs of the Pacific Ocean
Molluscs of the Mediterranean Sea
Gastropods of Cape Verde
Gastropods described in 1767
Taxa named by Carl Linnaeus